Webwork was an Indian website portal accused of being a Ponzi scheme. The site was promoted by a Bollywood star, and was said to have scammed Rs 125 crore from users. Webwork's directors were arrested in February 2017.

See also
 
 List of scandals in India
 Pyramid scheme
 Saradha Group financial scandal
 Corruption in India
 Rose Valley financial scandal

References

Pyramid and Ponzi schemes
Scandals in India
2017 scandals